Lahang Dumariya is a village in the Bhojpur district of the state of Bihar in India. It is located approximately 25 km from the major city of Ara. Lahang Dumariya consists of eight patti. The village is integrated, as several castes live together.

The government-run Rajkiya Madhya Vidyalaya school is located in the east side of the village. The Behea road to Salempur is also in the east side of the village, along with a temple to the god Shiva in Purana Dih.
There is a large Rajput population here.

The village has a number of historic temples, such as Maa Kali Temple, Thakurbari, Goreya Baba temple, Barkhandi Baba temple and a historic Akhada in front of the Hanuman temple. During Holi, all males meet at the north side of this village to celebrate this festival. In Durga puja, it's very big festival for this village. The statue of durga and other god is celebrated in the ground of school. The most holy festival is chhat for this village. During the period of flood, water of ganga come to the east of this village and after flood some water block here till the festival of chhat. This area called ajagara. The holy festival chhat is celebrated by many people of this village at ajagara ghaat.

References

Cities and towns in Bhojpur district, India